The Canadian Champion Female Turf Horse is a Canadian Thoroughbred horse racing honor that is part of the Sovereign Awards program awarded annually to the top female Thoroughbred horse competing in Canada in races on turf. Created in 1975, by the Jockey Club of Canada as a single award for Champion Turf Horse, it was first won by the filly Victorian Queen. In 1995, it was split into male and female categories.

Past winners

1995 : Bold Ruritana
1996 : Windsharp
1997 : Woolloomooloo
1998 : Colorful Vices
1999 : Free Vacation
2000 : Heliotrope
2001 : Sweetest Thing
2002 : Chopinina
2003 : Inish Glora
2004 : Inish Glora
2005 : Ambitious Cat
2006 : Arravale
2007 : Sealy Hill
2008 : Callwood Dancer
2009 : Points of Grace
2010 : Miss Keller
2011 : Never Retreat
2012 : Irish Mission
2013 : Solid Appeal
2014 : Lexie Lou
2015 : Catch a Glimpse
2016 : Lexie Lou
2017 : Starship Jubilee
2018 : Starship Jubilee
2019 : Starship Jubilee
2020 : Theodora B.

References

 The Sovereign Awards at the Jockey Club of Canada

Sovereign Award winners
Horse racing awards
Horse racing in Canada